Barefoot Books is an independent children’s book publisher. Founded in England on 9 September 1992, the company is based in Concord, Massachusetts, United States.

The company began as a home business in 1992 and was founded in England by Nancy Traversy and Tessa Strickland. Barefoot Books are sold via several outlets, including through the company's "Barefoot Books Community Book Seller" program. Book Sellers are individuals who sell Barefoot Books products through home parties, community, and school events. 

A number of books published by the company come with "watch and sing along" CDs. Notable voice performers who have recorded sing-alongs for Barefoot Books are Fred Penner and SteveSongs. Besides books, the company also sells story & music CDs, puzzles, puppets and other educational toys.

By 2006, Barefoot Books had released more than 400 books. In March 2012, the company released The Barefoot World Atlas app. In 2017, they were named by Forbes as one of the 25 Best Small Companies in America.

References

External links

Book publishing companies based in Massachusetts
Multi-level marketing companies
1992 establishments in England